Canal (Ward 16) is one of the 23 wards of Glasgow City Council. Since its creation in 2007 it has returned four council members, using the single transferable vote system. For the 2017 Glasgow City Council election, the boundaries were changed and the ward decreased in population, but continued to return four councillors.

Boundaries
Located in the north of Glasgow, the ward includes Possilpark and Milton as well as Ruchill, Firhill, Hamiltonhill, Parkhouse, Lambhill, Port Dundas and part of Cowlairs, consisting of the streets to the west of the Glasgow to Edinburgh via Falkirk Line railway tracks which form the ward's eastern boundary (the exception is a small section of the Colston neighbourhood on the eastern side of the tracks which is included to Canal ward; however, this area is further divided with everything north of Colston Road belonging to the adjoining town of Bishopbriggs in East Dunbartonshire). The west boundary is the Port Dundas branch of the Forth and Clyde Canal, which gives the ward its name.

The 2017 changes added more territory west of the main canal (which was previously the boundary but now lies mostly within the ward), taking in the Cadder neighbourhood from the Maryhill/Kelvin ward, along with a large area around Balmore Road which is almost uninhabited. In contrast, the more densely populated North Kelvinside neighbourhood was reassigned to the Hillhead ward.

Councillors

Election results

2022 election
2022 Glasgow City Council election

2017 election
2017 Glasgow City Council election

2012 election
2012 Glasgow City Council election

2007 election
2007 Glasgow City Council election

See also
Wards of Glasgow

References

External links
Listed Buildings in Canal Ward, Glasgow City at British Listed Buildings

Wards of Glasgow